The Gotland Infantry Regiment, designations I 27 and I 18, was a Swedish Army infantry regiment that traced its origins back to the 19th century. It was reorganized into an armoured regiment in 1963. The regiment's soldiers were originally recruited on the island of Gotland, and it was later garrisoned there.

History
The regiment has its origins in the unit Gotland National Conscription which was created in 1811. By a parliamentary decision in 1866 the Gotland National Conscription was transformed into an infantry regiment and an artillery corps (I 27 and A 4). A colonel was made regimental commander who also acted as the commander of Gotland's troops. The lieutenant colonel of the regiment came actually to serve as regimental commander until 1937. As of 1 January 1887 the regiment's name was Royal Gotland Infantry Regiment with the designation I 27. The regiment got a similar organization to other infantry regiments. The National Conscription's company area division remained until 1900 as the registration authority.

In 1892, the agreement that Gotland's troops may not be called for military service outside the island was repealed. At the same time the name Gotland National Conscription was dropped. In 1901, the army order on the mainland and Gotland became similar. This admitted, among other things, that conscripts from the mainland were transferred for training at I 27. There, at the same time, bicycle infantry training began.  In 1915, the regiment got Visborg Kungsladugård's land as training area and all the buildings as storehouses. The bicycle infantry was developed during the World War I and the 1920s so far that I 18 (which the regiment was designated from 1928) circa 1930 became the Sweden's first bicycle regiment with motorized trains.

The Defence Act of 1925 meant the end of the regiment. The regiment was downgraded to a corps which took over Västmanland Regiment designation I 18. The officers corps was reduced by 2/3. The mainland contingent of conscripts was also reduced substantially. In 1936, the Royal Swedish Gotland Infantry Corps was upgraded to a regiment with the name Royal Gotland Infantry Regiment, I 18. During World War II, armored units were added through the Göta Armoured Life Guards' Company in Gotland (P 1 G). Before the end of the war, this detachment was able to organize three companies (Stridsvagn m/42 and Stridsvagn m/37 and Pansarbil m/41).

Through the 1949 war organization, I 18, supported by P 1 G, became responsible for an armored reinforced bicycle brigade of five battalions. The seven armored companies received via Stridsvagn m/41, Stridsvagn m/40, Infanterikanonvagn 102 finally Stridsvagn 74. On 1 April 1963, the detachment was amalgamated with Gotland Infantry Regiment (I 18) and formed the Gotland Regiment (P 18) and was simultaneously transferred to the Swedish Armoured Troops.

Heraldry and traditions

Coat of arms
The coat of the arms of the Gotland Infantry Regiment. It was used by Gotland Group (Gotlandsgruppen) since 2000. Blazon: "Azure, the provincial badge of Gotland, a ram passant argent, armed or, banner gules, crosstaff, edging and five flaps or. The shield surmounted two swords in saltire or".

Commanding officers
Commanding officers active at the regiment the years 1884–1963. During the years 1884–1927 and 1937–1963, the commanding officer was referred to as regementschef ("regimental commander"). During the years 1928–1937 the commanding officer was referred to as kårchef ("corps commander").

Gotland Infantry Regiment, I 27 (1887–1928)

 1884-04-09 – 1896-12-31: Col Herman von Hohenhausen
 1895-07-29 – 1908-12-11: Col Gustaf Björlin
 1908-12-18 – 1912-04-13: Col Oscar Silverstolpe
 1912-07-02 – 1916-12-31: Col Erik Bergström
 1917-01-01 – 1922-10-21: Col Axel Carleson
 1922-20-22 – 1927-12-31: Col Tell Schmidt

Gotland Infantry Corps, I 18 (1928–1937)
 1928-01-01 – 1931-11-30: Col Olof Thörnell
 1931-12-01 – 1937-03-31: Col Gösta Törngren

Gotland Infantry Regiment, I 18 (1937–1963)
 1937-04-01 – 1940-12-31: Col Axel Linde
 1941-01-01 – 1942-09-30: Col Pehr Janse
 1942-10-01 – 1945-09-30: Col Gunnar Berggren
 1945-10-01 – 1951-09-30: Col Herman Levin
 1951-10-01 – 1957-09-30: Col Folke Haquinius
 1957-10-01 – 1964-03-31: Col Jan von Horn

Names, designations and locations

See also
 List of Swedish infantry regiments
 Military on Gotland
 Gotland Brigade
 Gotland Regiment
 Gotland Artillery Regiment

Footnotes

References

Notes

Print

Web

Further reading

 

Infantry regiments of the Swedish Army
Disbanded units and formations of Sweden
Military units and formations established in 1887
Military units and formations disestablished in 1963
1887 establishments in Sweden
1963 disestablishments in Sweden
Visby Garrison